Belmore Sports Ground, formerly known as Belmore Oval, is a multi-purpose stadium in Belmore, New South Wales, Australia. It is close to Belmore railway station.

The stadium has a capacity of 19,000 people and was built in 1920, with the grandstand itself having the capacity to seat 10,000 people. The ground record crowd for Belmore was set on 12 April 1993 when 27,804 fans saw Canterbury defeat local rivals Parramatta 42–6. The Canterbury-Bankstown Bulldogs and Sydney Olympic Football Club are the current co-tenants of the ground.

History
In 1920, the local council took steps to acquire park areas around the Belmore area. The park was named after the suburb it was located: Belmore Park. Belmore Park was eventually purchased in three sections between 1918 and 1921. The first two parcels were purchased by the State government and the third by Council. The park was opened around the early 1920s, the land was formerly known as Gunn's Paddock.  In 1936, council purchased a large stand from the Sydney Cricket Ground and had it re-erected at the park as part of unemployment relief works. This stand was opened on 14 March 1936 by Mayor SE Parry and was named after him. Around 1967, council moved other sports played at the park to grounds elsewhere and rugby league was given priority.

Ground Use

Association football
The ground is currently (and mainly) used for Association football as the home ground for former Australian National League club Sydney Olympic FC, who now competes in the New South Wales Premier League.

Sydney Olympic competed in the ground from 1977 to 2001 during the National Soccer League. In 2001 they left the ground to join Endeavour Field. Once the league ceased in mid-2004, the team returned to Belmore where they currently compete.

Rugby league
The Canterbury-Bankstown Bulldogs NRL team played their home games at Belmore Sports Ground from 1936 until 1998, after which time the club moved its home games to a series of more modern stadiums (currently Accor Stadium at Sydney Olympic Park). The club still used Belmore for training and administration, but subsequently moved these functions to a facility at Olympic Park in early 2008, leaving the club with no connection to the Sports Ground for the first time since the 1930s. However, the club subsequently announced its intention to redevelop the facilities at Belmore and move training and administration back to the ground. The Canterbury-Bankstown club relocated their offices and resumed training at the ground. In 2011, Canterbury's NSW Cup, SG Ball and Harold Matthews teams began playing most home games at Belmore once again.

The spectators' hill on the eastern side of the ground is named after Canterbury legend Terry Lamb.

From 1982 until the end of 1985, Canterbury's arch-rivals the Parramatta Eels used the ground as their temporary home ground while Parramatta Stadium was under construction. The St. George Dragons also used the ground for one season in 1988 while Kogarah Oval was re-developed.

Canterbury-Bankstown returned to playing NRL games at Belmore with two home games during the 2015 NRL season against Melbourne and Cronulla as part of its 80th anniversary celebrations. Canterbury-Bankstown played the Premiers, North Queensland Cowboys, and Canberra Raiders in the 2016 season at Belmore Sports Ground.

In 2016, it held an International rugby league match between the Cook Islands and Lebanon.

At the end of the 2016 NRL season, Belmore Sports Ground will have hosted 661 games of first grade rugby league since the first game on 13 April 1936. Of the active and semi-active grounds used by the NRL, only the SCG, Leichhardt Oval and Brookvale Oval have hosted more games.

Melanesian Cup

Back to Belmore

NRL pre-season trials

NRL season games

World Club Championship games

Ground record
The ground record attendance was set on 12 April 1993 during Round 5 of the 1993 NSWRL season when 27,804 saw Canterbury-Bankstown defeat Parramatta 42–6.

References

External links
Back to Belmore – Official Campaign Website

Sports venues in Sydney
Baseball venues in Australia
Rugby league stadiums in Australia
Soccer venues in Sydney
Multi-purpose stadiums in Australia
Sydney Olympic FC
St. George Dragons
1920 establishments in Australia
Sports venues completed in 1920
Parramatta Eels